Broken People may refer to:

 "Broken People", a 2016 album by the band Muddy Magnolias
 "Broken People", a 2017 song by Logic and Rag'n'Bone Man from the soundtrack of Bright
 "Broken People", a 2018 poetry collection by Norwegian poet Katrine Lynn Solvaag (published by Burning Eye Books)